Ust-Dzheguta (Cögetey Ayağı;;) is a town and the administrative center of Ust-Dzhegutinsky District of the Karachay–Cherkess Republic, Russia, located north of the Caucasus Mountains on the right bank of the Kuban River  south of Cherkessk. Population:  The dam here is the start of the Great Stavropol Canal.

History
It was founded in 1861 as the stanitsa of Dzhegutinskaya by the Cossacks. Town status was granted to it in 1975.

Administrative and municipal status
Within the framework of administrative divisions, Ust-Dzheguta serves as the administrative center of Ust-Dzhegutinsky District, of which it is a part. As a municipal division, the town of Ust-Dzheguta is incorporated within Ust-Dzhegutinsky Municipal District as Ust-Dzhegutinskoye Urban Settlement.

Demographics
Population:

Ethnic composition
As of the 2002 Census, the ethnic distribution of the population was:
Karachays: 49.6%
Russians: 35.3%
Abazins: 6.9%
Cherkess: 1.8%
Other ethnicities: 6.4%

Notable people
Russian singer Dima Bilan was born here.

References

Notes

Sources

Cities and towns in Karachay-Cherkessia